Biazon is a surname. Notable people with the surname include:
Rodolfo Biazon (born 1935), Filipino politician
Ruffy Biazon (born 1969), Filipino politician